The Mitsubishi Lancer (A70) is the first generation version of Mitsubishi's long-running Lancer nameplate. When introduced in 1973, it filled the gap between the Minica kei car and the considerably larger Galant. It was a replacement for the Colt 1200, last sold in 1970. Although sedan production ended in 1979, vans continued on until 1985. This Lancer also formed the basis for the Lancer Celeste sports coupé of 1975 through to 1981. These Lancers were sold under a multitude of names in different markets.

History

1973–1976
The Lancer A70 was launched in February 1973 in two- and four-door sedan form. It proved to be particularly successful in rallies, a claim that it retains to this day. The Lancer served to fill a gap in Mitsubishi's lineup in the small to lower-medium segment of the growing Japanese market. Twelve models were launched, ranging from a basic 1.2-litre sedan to a more powerful 1600 GSR model, successful in rallying.

There were three body styles (four if the Celeste liftback/coupé is included), two- and four-door sedans and a rarely seen five-door station wagon introduced in September 1973. In October 1975 the smallest engine was replaced by another 1.2-litre four, the 80 hp 4G36. In November, the entire engine lineup lost around eight–nine percent of its power, as a result of the stricter emissions standards for 1976. Reflecting a popular appearance during the 1970s, the Lancer adopted "coke bottle styling" on the sedan and wagon for this entire generation.

Originally, the Lancer received an OHV 1.2-litre Neptune 4G42, an OHC 1.4-litre Saturn 4G33 or the larger 1.6-litre 4G32.

This vehicle was sold as the Colt Lancer in the United Kingdom, Ireland and other European countries. In some Latin American countries, as for example, in El Salvador, the car initially was known as the Dodge Lancer. This reluctance to use the Mitsubishi brand in many export markets stemmed from a fear of buyer resistance amongst those who could still remember fighting Japanese pilots in Mitsubishi A6M Zeros.

In the Australian market, the first generation models were initially sold under the Chrysler Valiant Lancer name, with approximately 11,800 units sold between late 1974 and 1979. The original LA series was released in September 1974 in two levels of specification, a basic two-door EL and the four-door GL sedan which offered a higher level of equipment. This could be paired with either an all-synchromesh four-speed manual, or a three-speed automatic.

The 1.6-liter engine was reserved for the two-door version, while four-door sedans only received the 1.4. Top speeds were 150, 155, and 165 km/h.

1976–1979

In November 1976 the Japanese market models received a facelift, losing the previous L-shaped/upright rear lamps in favor of wide rectangular units. Front indicators were enlarged and moved, and new bigger rubber bumpers were also added, and new grilles were introduced. This generation gradually became the A140-series in Japan, reflecting the introduction of new engines. Since it kept the 4G32 engine, the GSR was referred to as an A73 until the very end in spite of having received all of the bodywork modifications.

As a response to the new emissions standards taking effect in 1978, the 1.2-litre Saturn engine was replaced by the new 70 PS Orion G11B (1,244 cc) in April 1977. This was the new lean-burning MCA-Jet engine, which was added to the existing Saturn 4G33 and 4G32 engines in June.

It was this series that emerged in the United States as the Dodge Colt for the 1977 model year (Plymouth Colt in Canada), taking over from a badge-engineered Mitsubishi Galant from the previous year. It was offered for one more model year before the Dodge Colt name was gradually transferred to the front wheel drive Mitsubishi Mirage. The very large safety bumpers used in the American market were added to certain models in the domestic range in March 1978 (GL Extra, GSL, GSR) as part of one last minor facelift.

April 1977 saw the introduction of the facelift model in Australia, designated locally as the LB series. This was discontinued in May 1979, having lost most of its market share to the bigger, locally built Chrysler Sigma.

1600 GSR
The high-performance Mitsubishi Lancer 1600 GSR sold as the Colt Lancer 1600 GSR in Europe, was developed by Mitsubishi Motors to further their aspirations in off-road racing, especially the Safari Rally of Kenya. Thanks to repeated triumphs in what was the most gruelling rally in the world, it earned the nickname "King of Cars" in Africa.

Street versions originally developed , but this dropped to  when tighter emissions standards were introduced for 1976.

After sporadic successes with the Colt and Galant rally cars in previous years, Mitsubishi decided to develop a Lancer model specifically to tackle the notorious Safari Rally. Run over 6,000 km of arduous terrain under searing equatorial temperatures, the race was regarded as the toughest in the world, and typically only one car in five which set off from the start would manage to reach the finish line in Nairobi. Mitsubishi sanctioned official factory teams for the 1974–77 events, building for itself an enviable reputation for durability when only one of thirteen cars failed to finish in those four attempts. The high point was a clean sweep of the podium places in 1976.

The car had previously demonstrated similar qualities in 1973, with its debut in the Australian Southern Cross Rally being rewarded with a clean sweep of the top four places. Works driver Andrew Cowan would go on to dominate this race in the '70s, winning five consecutive titles from 1972 to '76. Cowan and Joginder Singh also scored a 1–2 finish for the Lancer GSR at the 1977 Rallye Bandama Côte d'Ivoire.

Even after production ended it remained a popular car with privateers into the 1980s. However, the decline of endurance rallying and the rise of the Group B class eventually signaled its demise.

Van/Wagon

As there was no station wagon version of the Lancer EX, the first generation Lancer Van (wagon) continued in production for the home and select export markets until February 1985, by which time the car was conspicuously outmoded. When the 1.2-litre pushrod was replaced in 1975, Vans for the domestic market retained the old Neptune engine for an extra year, and the 1238/1439 cc Saturn engines weren't replaced by Orions until March 1979. The smaller Orion engined version (1.2 L A141V) continued to be available in Greece and Kenya into the eighties. Wagon versions for export received updates on the same schedule as did export sedans/coupés. The domestic market vans received yet another update in October 1981, again to clean emissions, meaning that a new set of chassis numbers were assigned. The home market vans were available in Standard (only 1200), EL, and GL trim levels. The Lancer Van was finally replaced by the new front-wheel drive Mirage/Lancer Wagon and Van in February 1985.

Celeste

In February 1975, the Lancer was complemented by a hatchback coupé called the Mitsubishi Lancer Celeste (A70-series). It succeeded the Galant FTO, which never did very well in the marketplace due to confusion with the Galant GTO and carrying too high a price. It was also called the Mitsubishi Celeste or Colt Celeste in some markets; and sold as the Chrysler Lancer Hatchback in Australia, the Dodge Lancer Celeste in El Salvador, the Plymouth Arrow in the United States, and the Dodge Arrow in Canada. Sitting on the same 2,340 mm wheelbase as the Lancer, length was up to 4,115 mm.

The Celeste was originally available with 1.4- and 1.6-litre options, a bigger 2.0-litre model was added later. The 1979–80 Plymouth Fire Arrow came with an even larger (2,555 cc) four-cylinder, but strangled by American emissions regulations it only offered , no more than the Japanese market 2000 GT. Along with receiving a light facelift in July 1977, including new taillights and the cleaner (but lower powered) MCA-Jet engines, new model codes (A140-series) were introduced. There was another facelift in April 1978; square headlights and bigger, less integrated bumpers heralded the coming eighties. Named accordingly, a top-of-the-line GT System 80 version had appeared in November 1977, including every possible extra and special black and gold paintwork. This was trumped by the  2000 GT introduced in June 1979, with a version of the 2-litre Astron engine already used in export since October 1975. Production of the Lancer Celeste ended in July 1981 and it was replaced by the front-wheel drive Cordia in early 1982.

Because of the Arrow's long, narrow, aerodynamic, lightweight design and rugged suspension, it was used extensively in various types of racing including SCCA road racing, rally and drag racing.  The Arrow body design was used on pro stock and funny cars in the late 1970s by noteworthy racers such as Ray Godman, Don Prudhomme, Bob Glidden  and  Raymond Beadle.

Australia

The 1.6-liter Celeste was sold in Australia as the Chrysler Lancer Hatchback  as part of the LB series from April 1977. It featured sports instrumentation and a  version of the 4G32. The final LC iteration arrived in May 1979 with a rationalised model range which saw the sedan body variant deleted. Changes were as for 1979 Celestes, comprising rectangular headlamps, redesigned tail-lamps, black painted metal bumpers, a new five-speed manual transmission, and a belt driven SOHC version of the 4G32 engine called the G32B. During 1981, the Chrysler was rebranded Mitsubishi Lancer in the Australian market, lasting until August the same year.

Some of the Australian cars featured had "arrow" decals on the hood and stripes on the flanks, depending on the body colour. These were less flamboyant than on those sold in the North American market.

North America

Chrysler introduced the Plymouth Arrow as a captive import of the Celeste in January 1976 as an extension to the Dodge Colt lineup. It was also known as the Dodge Arrow in Canada. It was also sold as the Dodge Celeste in Puerto Rico.

The Arrow was a rear-wheel drive car utilizing a solid rear axle and leaf springs in the rear, with MacPherson struts in the front. Transmission types included four and five-speed manual transmissions and a three-speed automatic. A 1.6 L inline-four engine was standard with an optional 2.0 L I4. It was produced in various trim levels including the 160, GS and GT. The first year Arrow is easily identified from later years because its quarter-window louvers have two slats in the center, which were changed to three on all later years. The 1976 Arrow also came with a single windshield-wiper fluid nozzle on the hood, which was changed to dual nozzles for 1977 and remained that way for all later year Arrows.

Sporty exterior finishes were also offered, such as the Arrow Jet package, first offered in 1978.  The Arrow Jet paint package was an eye-catching two-tone finish, typically in spit-fire orange and black.  The entire car was spit-fire orange, but the entire bottom half of the car was covered in a solid flat black stripe with the words "Arrow Jet" stenciled out of the stripe on the doors so that the underlying body color showed through.  This color combination of spit-fire orange and flat black seems to pay tribute to one of the design inspirations for the Plymouth Arrow, that being the Plymouth Barracuda. In 1971, the Barracuda was offered with a "billboard" decal option, which was a large, solid flat black decal that covered the entire back half of the car on both sides (often in a red and flat black color combination).

For 1979, the styling was freshened with the addition of flush bumpers, a more horizontal grille with rectangular headlights and hidden turn signals, chrome strips on the tail-lamps, and larger rear glass for the hatchback. Inside, the steering wheel previously found only in the Arrow GT was now standard while the heater provided more output. The rear axle was also extended 2.5 inches for better traction. A sporty variant called the Fire Arrow was first offered this year, which had special decals and a sporty interior, as well as a 2.6 L I4 engine and four-wheel disc brakes. The Fire Arrow had one of the best horsepower/weight ratios among U.S. production cars at the time because of its light weight. The 2.6 was also optional on the GS and GT models, and was only offered in conjunction with disc brakes all around. For 1979 and the succeeding year, the lineup began with the base Arrow (where the 2.0 L I4 engine was a new engine option), followed by the GS, GT, and the Fire Arrow on top.

The styling changes of the 1979 models carried over to 1980. The Fire Arrow however, was changed significantly. The 1980 Fire Arrow was now available with two new paint schemes: tan with a darker caramel-colored hood, and blue with a dark blue hood. These colored models were available with the smaller 1.6 engine and, like the base-model Arrows, had bumpers that were chrome instead of body color. The white Fire Arrow was also changed, and now had a matte-black hood and cowl, with the black paint continuing along the tops of the fenders and doors and ending under the quarter-windows. Unlike the colored versions, the white/black Fire Arrow had only one engine option, the 2.6 I4.

The Arrow coupe was discontinued after the 1980 model-year. A pickup truck version of the Arrow sharing very few parts with the coupe was released in 1979. Also available with the 2.6 L engine, the pickup was discontinued after 1982. The Arrow coupe's styling strongly influenced the design of the Plymouth Arrow Truck and its cousins; the Dodge D-50 and Mitsubishi Mighty Max pickups.

The Harry Nilsson song, Me and My Arrow (from The Point!) was used in television commercials in the United States promoting the Plymouth Arrow during the 1970s.

One of the more interesting options available for the Arrow was a small tent.  When the rear seats were lowered and the tent was clipped over the open hatchback, it would allow the back of the car to be used for camping. General Motors would borrow this design many years later for the Pontiac Aztek.

Specifications and timeline
Data tables expand. Models listed are primarily as available in the Japanese domestic market, with notes on important export variants. For information on the Lancer-based Dodge Colt see that article.

References 

Lancer (A70)
Rear-wheel-drive vehicles
Cars introduced in 1973
1980s cars